Bob Hale, FRSE (1945 – 12 December 2017) was a British philosopher, known for his contributions to the development of the neo-Fregean (neo-logicist) philosophy of mathematics in collaboration with Crispin Wright, and for his works in modality and philosophy of language.

Career
Hale obtained a BPhil in Philosophy in 1967 from Linacre College, University of Oxford. From 2006 until his death, he was a professor of philosophy in the department of philosophy at the University of Sheffield. Prior to that, he taught in the University of Glasgow, the University of St. Andrews and the University of Lancaster.

Hale produced the first published neo-Fregean construction of the real numbers. In his book (Necessary Beings), he argues for an essentialist theory of necessity and possibility.

Notable positions
 British Academy Research Reader (1997–9)
 Fellow of the Royal Society of Edinburgh (from 2000)
 President of the Aristotelian Society (2002–3)
 Leverhulme Senior Research Fellow (2009–11)

Selected works
 (1987) Abstract Objects. Oxford: Blackwell Publishing.
 (1997) Co-editor with Crispin Wright. The Blackwell Companion to the Philosophy of Language. Oxford: Blackwell Publishing.
 (2001) With Crispin Wright. The Reason's Proper Study: Essays towards a Neo-Fregean Philosophy of Mathematics.  Oxford: Oxford University Press.
 (2013) "Necessary Beings: An Essay on Ontology, Modality, and the relations between them" Oxford: Oxford University Press.

References

External links 
 Interview at 3:AM Magazine

1945 births
2017 deaths
20th-century British philosophers
21st-century British philosophers
Philosophers of language
Philosophers of mathematics
Academics of the University of Sheffield
Fellows of the Royal Society of Edinburgh
Presidents of the Aristotelian Society